Now 04 is a compilation CD released under EMI Music Australia in 2003. Starting with this album, the CD contained pictures on the front and back covers. The album was the #11 compilation of the year and was certified platinum.

Track listing
 Jewel – "Intuition" (3:48)
 Stacie Orrico – "(There's Gotta Be) More to Life"  (3:20)
 Amiel Daemion – "Obsession (I Love You)" (3:53)
 Amanda Perez – "Angel" (3:37)
 Robbie Williams – "Something Beautiful" (4:01)
 Sean Paul – "Get Busy" (3:32)
 The J Wess Project – "Bang This" (3:35)
 Chingy – "Right Thurr" (3:37)
 Dannii Minogue – "Don't Wanna Lose This Feeling" (3:31)
 Benny Benassi – "Satisfaction" (3:11)
 Liam Lynch – "United States of Whatever" (1:28)
 Panjabi MC featuring Jay-Z –  "Mundian To Bach Ke (Beware of the Boys)" (3:00)
 Missy Elliott featuring Ludacris – "Gossip Folks" (Fatboy Slim Radio Remix) (3:30)
 Mis-Teeq – "Scandalous" (Stargate Radio Mix) (3:58)
 Bec Cartwright – "A Matter of Time" (3:28)
 Sophie Monk – "One Breath Away" (3:39)
 Michael Woods featuring Imogen Bailey – "If U Want Me" (Lifestylers Edit) (3:33)
 Matchbox Twenty – "Unwell" (3:48)
 Coldplay – "God Put a Smile upon Your Face" (4:57)
 Hot Action Cop – "Fever for the Flava" (3:41)
 Mandy Kane – "Stab" (3:49)
 Groove Terminator – "Here Comes Another One" (2:59)

References

External links
 NOW 04 @ Australian Charts

2003 compilation albums
EMI Records compilation albums
Now That's What I Call Music! albums (Australian series)